Josef Meinrad Bisig (born 2 September 1952) is a Swiss Roman Catholic priest, and co-founder and first superior general of the Priestly Fraternity of Saint Peter.  He was originally a member of the Society of Saint Pius X but left when founder Archbishop Marcel Lefebvre illicitly consecrated four bishops.

Formerly a seminary rector in Europe, Bisig was appointed vice-rector and theology professor at Our Lady of Guadalupe Seminary in 2005. Bisig became rector in 2006 and is also a councillor of his order. He has a licentiate in Sacred Theology, and is currently preparing a doctorate of theology. He speaks German, French, English and Italian.

References

External links
Priestly Fraternity of St. Peter - international website with pages in English, French, German, Spanish, Portuguese, Italian, Polish, and Latin
Organizational chart of FSSP leadership

Living people
1952 births
20th-century Swiss Roman Catholic priests
Swiss traditionalist Catholics
Traditionalist Catholic priests
21st-century Swiss Roman Catholic priests
Former members of the Society of Saint Pius X
Priestly Fraternity of St. Peter
Founders of Catholic religious communities